Westward Journey may refer to:
The Westward Journey, sculpture group on the Indiana Statehouse, USA
Westward Journey, a series of computer games
Fantasy Westward Journey
Westward Journey Online II
Westward Journey Nickel Series, American coins
Journey to the West, in Chinese literature